Og Mountain is located on the border of Alberta and British Columbia on the Continental Divide. It was named in 1966 after references in the Bible.

See also
 List of peaks on the Alberta–British Columbia border
 Mountains of Alberta
 Mountains of British Columbia

References

Og Mountain
Og Mountain
Canadian Rockies